The Putrajaya Power Station (PJPS) is a gas turbine power station in Sepang District, Selangor, Malaysia. Previously known as Serdang Power Station, PJPS is one of seven thermal power stations owned by Tenaga Nasional Berhad (TNB). It is under the management of TNB's Generation Division whose core business is generating electricity by operating and maintaining power plants.

History
Built as Serdang Power Station in 1993 with a generating capacity of 625 MW, PJPS was part of TNB's plan to increase power generation capacity to meet Malaysia's rising electricity demand in the early 1990s. The gas turbine plant in PJPS consists of two units of 110MW General Electric Frame 9E model and three units of Siemens 135MW V94.2 Ratio model. PJPS is a peaking power plant serving the Klang Valley load center. Its operating regime is of two shift cycles, operating between 12 and 16 hours daily mainly to meet the load demand during peak hours and stabilize the grid line voltage. The machine can be put on commercial loading within 30 minutes upon request from Malaysia's National Load Dispatch Center.

PJPS is located in Putrajaya, the administrative center of Malaysia. For this reason, the station has been identified as a lead station for restoration of Putrajaya Island in the event of interruption of electricity. Its name was changed to Putrajaya Power Station on 15 February 2006.

See also
 List of power stations in Malaysia

References

1993 establishments in Malaysia
Buildings and structures in Selangor
Energy infrastructure completed in 1993
Natural gas-fired power stations in Malaysia
Sepang District
Power stations in Malaysia
20th-century architecture in Malaysia